Harvi  is a village in the southern state of Karnataka, India. It is located in the Manvi taluk of Raichur district.

Demographics
 India census, Harvi had a population of 6463 with 3314 males and 3149 females.

See also
 Raichur
 Districts of Karnataka

References

External links
 Official Website of Raichur district

Villages in Raichur district